Việt Báo Daily News is a Vietnamese-language daily newspaper published in Garden Grove, California, for the Vietnamese-American community. Việt Báo is one of five Vietnamese daily newspapers distributed in Little Saigon.

History 
Việt Báo was founded in 1992 by two former South Vietnamese writers, novelist Nhã Ca and poet Trần Dạ Từ. It was originally titled  (Vietnamese Economic News) and based in Westminster, California. It published weekly until 1995, when it began publishing daily. By 2012, it also printed local editions in San Jose, California; Tacoma, Washington; and Houston.

Writing contest 
Since May 2000, Việt Báo and the non-profit Việt Báo Foundation have organized an annual writing contest, Writing on America, generally for essays about the Vietnamese-American experience. By 2012, the contest had received a total of 17,000 entries, of which 4,380 had been edited and published. Anthologies have been published in English and Vietnamese. The awards ceremony has drawn attendees from across the country.

See also 
 Người Việt Daily News
 Viễn Đông Daily News

References

External links 
  
 Viết Về Nước Mỹ 

Mass media in Orange County, California
Vietnamese-language newspapers published in California
Organizations based in Garden Grove, California
Daily newspapers published in Greater Los Angeles
Publications established in 1992
1992 establishments in California